Shahnaz Naseer Baloch is a Pakistani politician who has been a member of the National Assembly of Pakistan since August 2018.

Political career

She was elected to the National Assembly of Pakistan as a candidate of Balochistan National Party (Mengal) on a reserved seat for women from Balochistan in 2018 Pakistani general election.

References

External links
National Assembly of Pakistan

Living people
Women members of the National Assembly of Pakistan
Pakistani MNAs 2018–2023
Balochistan National Party (Mengal) MNAs
Year of birth missing (living people)
21st-century Pakistani women politicians